The Estonian Rescue Board is a government agency under the Ministry of the Interior of Estonia. It is tasked with maintaining a secure environment in Estonia, anticipating threats and helping people in the event of an accident. Its mission is to prevent accidents, save lives, property, and the environment. The organization provides a large number of services, including emergency response, firefighting, oil pollution removal, explosive ordnance disposal, chemical and radiation hazard elimination, water rescue etc.

History
The predecessors of the Estonian Rescue Board were the Firefighting Administration under the Ministry of Internal Affairs of the Soviet Union, which was renamed the Fire Fighting Board of the Ministry of the Interior in 1990, and a separate civil defence organization. On September 10, 1991, the Civil Defence Staff was reformed into the National Rescue Board of the Republic of Estonia. The organization was officially established on May 25, 1992, with the liquidation of the State Fire Service Board and transferral of resources and tasks to the National Rescue Board. This move combined civil protection, firefighting and rescue operations under the domain of one organization. The establishment of the new organization was supported by new legislation in the form of the Civil Protection Act in 1992, and the Rescue Act of the Republic of Estonia in 1994. In 2012, the organization was restructured. The Alarm Center became an independent government agency and regional rescue centers were merged under the unified management of the Estonian Rescue Board.

Structure

The Estonian Rescue Board is led by a Director General, who is supported by Deputy Director Generals. The Deputy Director Generals help in leading the various departments of the Rescue Board, which develop, plan, manage and implement the activities of rescue centers. These departments include: emergency management department, rescue work department, explosive ordnance disposal ("EOD"), prevention department, safety supervision department, administrative department, human resource department, development department, legal department, finance department, communications department, and the Estonian Firefighting Museum. The Director General oversees the work of rescue centres. There are four rescue centers: North, South, East and West Regional Rescue Center. The rescue centers have various bureaus, which include the prevention bureau, safety supervision bureau, and preparedness bureau. Rescue centers also govern rescue regions, consisting of rescue brigades and stand-by groups. There are 72 national rescue brigades, 119 voluntary rescue brigades, and 4 EOD squads.

See also

 Estonian Firefighting Museum
 Estonian Voluntary Rescue Association
 Vabatahtlik Reservpäästerühm
 Police and Border Guard Board
 IT and Development Centre. Ministry of the Interior, Estonia

References

External links

Law enforcement agencies of Estonia